The Engineering, Printing and Manufacturing Union (EPMU) was the largest private sector trade union in New Zealand. It was formed in 1996 by the merger of the Engineers' Union (EU), the Printing, Packaging and Manufacturing Union (PPMU), and the Communications and Energy Workers' Union (CEWU).

The EPMU represented workers in eleven industries, including:

 Engineering
 Print & Media
 Manufacturing
 Telecommunications
 Timber
 Aviation
 Plastics
 Postal & Logistics
 Petrochemical & Extractive
 Public Services & Infrastructure
 Food

The EPMU had 40,000 members and was affiliated with the New Zealand Council of Trade Unions and the New Zealand Labour Party. It was also an affiliate of the International Federation of Journalists. In October 2015, it merged with the Service & Food Workers Union to form E tū.

References

External links
 EPMU official site.

New Zealand Council of Trade Unions
Trade unions in New Zealand
International Federation of Journalists
Manufacturing trade unions
Trade unions established in 1996
Trade unions disestablished in 2015